The Russian conquest of Siberia took place during 1580–1778, when the Khanate of Sibir became a loose political structure of vassalages that were being undermined by the activities of Russian explorers. Although outnumbered, the Russians pressured the various family-based tribes into changing their loyalties and establishing distant forts from which they conducted raids. It is traditionally considered that Yermak Timofeyevich's campaign against the Siberian Khanate began in 1580. The annexation of Siberia and the Far East to Russia was resisted by local residents and took place against the backdrop of fierce battles between the indigenous peoples and the Russian Cossacks, who often committed atrocities against the indigenous peoples.

Conquest of the Khanate of Sibir

The Russian conquest of Siberia began in July 1580 when some 540 Cossacks under Yermak Timofeyevich invaded the territory of the Voguls, subjects to Kuchum Khan, ruler of the Sibir Khanate. They were accompanied by some Lithuanian and German mercenaries and prisoners of war. Throughout 1581, this force traversed the territory known as Yugra and subdued Vogul and Ostyaks towns. At this time, they also captured a tax collector of Kuchum Khan.

Following a series of Tatar raids in retaliation against the Russian advance, Yermak's forces prepared for a campaign to take Qashliq, the Siberian capital. The force embarked in May 1582. After a three-day battle on the banks of the Irtysh River, Yermak was victorious against a combined force of Kuchum Khan and six allied Tatar princes. On 29 June, the Cossack forces were attacked by the Tatars but again repelled them.

Throughout September 1582, the Khan gathered his forces for a defense of Qashliq. A horde of Siberian Tatars, Voguls, and Ostyaks massed at Mount Chyuvash to defend against invading Cossacks. On 1 October, a Cossack attempt to storm the Tatar fort at Mount Chyuvash was held off. On 23 October, the Cossacks attempted to storm the Tatar fort at Mount Chyuvash for a fourth time when the Tatars counterattacked. More than a hundred Cossacks were killed, but their gunfire forced a Tatar retreat and allowed the capture of two Tatar cannons. The forces of the Khan retreated, and Yermak entered Qashliq on 26 October.

Kuchum Khan retreated into the steppes and over the next few years regrouped his forces. He suddenly attacked Yermak on 6 August 1584 in the dead of night and defeated most of his army. The details are disputed with Russian sources claiming Yermak was wounded and tried to escape by swimming across the Wagay River which is a tributary of the Irtysh River, but drowned under the weight of his own chain mail. The remains of Yermak's forces under the command of Mescheryak retreated from Qashliq, destroying the city as they left. In 1586, the Russians returned, and after subduing the Khanty and Mansi people through the use of their artillery they established a fortress at Tyumen close to the ruins of Qashliq. The Tatar tribes that were submissive to Kuchum Khan suffered from several attacks by the Russians between 1584–1595; however, Kuchum Khan would not be caught. Finally, in August 1598, Kuchum Khan was defeated at the  near the Ob River. In the course of the fight, the Siberian royal family was captured by the Russians. However, Kuchum Khan escaped yet again. The Russians took the family members of Kuchum Khan to Moscow and there they remained as hostages. The descendants of the khan's family became known as the Princes Sibirsky and the family is known to have survived until at least the late 19th century.

Despite his personal escape, the capture of his family ended the political and military activities of Kuchum Khan and he retreated to the territories of the Nogai Horde in southern Siberia. He had been in contact with the tsar and had requested that a small region on the banks of the Irtysh River would be granted as his dominion. This was rejected by the tsar who proposed to Küçüm Khan that he come to Moscow and "comfort himself" in the service of the tsar. However, the old khan did not want to suffer from such contempt and preferred staying in his own lands to "comforting himself" in Moscow. Kuchum Khan then went to Bukhara and as an old man became blind, dying in exile with distant relatives sometime around 1605.

Conquest and exploration

In order to subjugate the natives and collect yasak (fur tribute), a series of winter outposts and forts (ostrogs) were built at the confluences of major rivers and streams and important portages. The first among these were Tyumen and Tobolsk—the former built in 1586 by Vasilii Sukin and Ivan Miasnoi, and the latter the following year by Danilo Chulkov. Tobolsk would become the nerve center of the conquest. To the north Beryozovo (1593) and Mangazeya (1600–01) were built to bring the Nenets under tribute, while to the east Surgut (1594) and Tara (1594) were established to protect Tobolsk and subdue the ruler of the Narym Ostiaks. Of these, Mangazeya was the most prominent, becoming a base for further exploration eastward.

Advancing up the Ob and its tributaries, the ostrogs of Ketsk (1602) and Tomsk (1604) were built. Ketsk  ("servicemen") reached the Yenisei in 1605, descending it to the Sym; two years later Mangazeyan promyshlenniks and traders descended the Turukhan to its confluence with the Yenisei, where they established the  Turukhansk. By 1610, men from Turukhansk had reached the mouth of the Yenisei and ascended it as far as the Sym, where they met rival tribute collectors from Ketsk. To ensure subjugation of the natives, the ostrogs of Yeniseysk (1619) and Krasnoyarsk (1628) were established.

Following the khan's death and the dissolution of any organised Siberian resistance, the Russians advanced first towards Lake Baikal and then the Sea of Okhotsk and the Amur River. However, when they first reached the Chinese border they encountered people that were equipped with artillery pieces and here they halted.

The Russians reached the Pacific Ocean in 1639. After the conquest of the Siberian Khanate (1598), the whole of North Asia – an area much larger than the old khanate – became known as Siberia and, by 1640, the eastern borders of Russia had expanded more than several million square kilometres. In a sense, the khanate lived on in the subsidiary title "Tsar of Siberia" which became part of the full imperial style of the Russian autocrats.

The conquest of Siberia also resulted in the spread of diseases. Historian John F. Richards wrote: "... it is doubtful that the total early modern Siberian population exceeded 300,000 persons. ... New diseases weakened and demoralized the indigenous peoples of Siberia. The worst of these was smallpox "because of its swift spread, the high death rates, and the permanent disfigurement of survivors." ... In the 1650s, it moved east of the Yenisey, where it carried away up to 80 percent of the Tungus and Yakut populations. In the 1690s, smallpox epidemics reduced Yukagir numbers by an estimated 44 percent. The disease moved rapidly from group to group across Siberia."

Effects on the indigenous peoples of Siberia

Upon arrival in an area occupied by a tribe of natives, the Cossacks entered into peace talks with a proposal to submit to the White Tsar and to pay yasak, but these negotiations did not always lead to successful results. When their entreaties were rejected, the Cossacks chose to respond with force. At the hands of people such as Vasilii Poyarkov in 1645 and Yerofei Khabarov in 1650 some many people, including members of the Daur tribe, were killed by the Cossacks. 8,000 out of a previous population of 20,000 in Kamchatka remained after the first half century of the Russian conquest. The Daurs initially deserted their villages fearing the reported cruelty of the Russians the first time Khabarov came. The second time he came, the Daurs fought back against the Russians, but were slaughtered. In the 17th century, indigenous peoples of the Amur region were attacked by Russians who came to be known as "red-beards".

In the 1640s, the Yakuts were subjected to violent expeditions during the Russian advance into the land near the Lena River, and on Kamchatka in the 1690s the Koryaks, Kamchadals, and Chukchi were also subjected to this by the Russians according to Western historian Stephen Shenfield. When the Russians did not obtain the demanded amount of yasak from the natives, the governor of Yakutsk, Piotr Golovin, who was a Cossack, used meat hooks to hang the native men. In the Lena basin, 70% of the Yakut population declined within 40 years, native women were raped and, along with children, were often enslaved in order to force the natives to pay the Yasak.

According to John F. Richards:

In Kamchatka, the Russians crushed the Itelmen uprisings against their rule in 1706, 1731, and 1741. The first time, the Itelmens were armed with stone weapons and were badly unprepared and equipped but they used gunpowder weapons the second time. The Russians faced tougher resistance when from 1745–1756 they tried to subjugate the gun and bow equipped Koryaks until their victory. The Russian Cossacks also faced fierce resistance and were forced to give up when trying unsuccessfully to wipe out the Chukchi in 1729, 1730–1731, and 1744–1747. After the Russian defeat in 1729 at Chukchi hands, the Russian commander Major Pavlutskiy was responsible for the Russian war against the Chukchi and the mass slaughters and enslavement of Chukchi women and children in 1730–1731, but his cruelty only made the Chukchis fight more fiercely. Cleansing of the Chukchis and Koryaks was ordered by Empress Elizabeth in 1742 to totally expel them from their native lands and erase their culture through war. The command was that the natives be "totally extirpated" with Pavlutskiy leading again in this war from 1744–1747 in which he led to the Cossacks "with the help of Almighty God and to the good fortune of Her Imperial Highness", to slaughter the Chukchi men and enslave their women and children as booty. However the Chukchi ended this campaign and forced them to give up by decapitating and killing Pavlutskiy.

The Russians were also launching wars and slaughters against the Koryaks in 1744 and 1753–1754. After the Russians tried to force the natives to convert to Christianity, the different native peoples like the Koryaks, Chukchis, Itelmens, and Yukaghirs all united to drive the Russians out of their land in the 1740s, culminating in the assault on Nizhnekamchatsk fort in 1746. Kamchatka today is European in demographics and culture with only 5% of it being native, around 10,000 from a previous number of 150,000, due to the mass slaughters by the Cossacks after its annexation in 1697 of the Itelmens and Koryaks throughout the first decades of Russian rule. The killings by the Russian Cossacks devastated the native peoples of Kamchatka. In addition to committing massacres the Cossacks also devastated the wildlife by slaughtering massive numbers of animals for fur. 90% of the Kamchadals and half of the Vogules were killed from the eighteenth to nineteenth centuries and the rapid slaughter of the indigenous population led to entire ethnic groups being entirely wiped out, with around 12 exterminated groups which could be named by Nikolai Yadrintsev as of 1882. Much of the slaughter was brought on by the Siberian fur trade.

The oblastniki in the 19th century among the Russians in Siberia acknowledged that the natives were subjected to immense violent exploitation, and claimed that they would rectify the situation with their proposed regionalist policies.

The Aleuts in the Aleutians were subjected to genocide and slavery by the Russians for the first 20 years of Russian rule, with the Aleut women and children captured by the Russians and Aleut men slaughtered.

The Russian colonization of Siberia and conquest of its indigenous peoples has been compared to the European colonization of the Americas and its natives, with similar negative impacts on the natives and the appropriation of their land. The Slavic Russians outnumber all of the native peoples in Siberia and its cities except in the Republics of Tuva and Sakha, with the Slavic Russians making up the majority in the Buryat and Altai Republics, outnumbering the Buriat, and Altai natives. The Buryats make up only 33.5% of their own Republic, the Altai  37% and the Chukchi only 28%; the Evenk, Khanty, Mansi, and Nenets are outnumbered by non-natives by 90% of the population. The natives were targeted by the tsars and Soviet policies to change their way of life, and ethnic Russians were given the natives' reindeer herds and wild game which were confiscated by the tsars and Soviets. The reindeer herds have been mismanaged to the point of extinction.

The Ainu have emphasized that they were the natives of the Kuril Islands and that the Japanese and Russians were both invaders.

Timeline of conquest

16th century: Conquest of Western Siberia 

 1581-1585 - Siberian campaign of Ermak Timofeevich
 1586 - Vasily Sukin founded Tyumen (the first Russian city in Siberia), on the site on the former capital of the Siberian Khanate
 1587 - Tobolsk was founded on the Irtysh, which  later became the "Capital of Siberia"
 1590 - the first decree on the resettlement of the Russian population in Siberia (35 "arable people" from Solvychegodsk district "with their wives and children and with all the estate" were sent to settle in Siberia)
 1593 - Berezov founded
 1594 - Surgut and Tara founded 
 1595 - Obdorsk founded
 1598 - conquest of the Piebald Horde, Narym founded
 1598 - , the final conquest of the Siberian Khanate.

17th century: From the Yenisei to the Pacific Ocean, conflicts with China 

 1601 - Mangazeya was founded (to control the West Siberian Samoyeds)
 1604 - Tomsk was founded as a fortress against the Dzungars and the Yenisei Kirghiz
 1607 - Turukhansk was founded (the first city on the Yenisei), the conquest of the Enets
 1618 - Kuznetsk founded
 1619 - Yeniseisk founded
 after 1620 - an unknown unsuccessful expedition to Taimyr (finds in Simsa Bay and the Thaddeus Islands)
 1623 - Pyanda first reached the Lena River in the Kirensk region
 1628 - Voivode Andrey Dubensky founded Krasnoyarsk on the Yenisei, Kansky Ostrozhek was founded
 1630 - Vasily Bugor founded Kirensk on the Lena, Ivan Galkin founded the llim winter hut
 1631 - Ataman Maxim Perfilyev founded the Bratsk prison on the Angara, the Ust-Kutsk prison was founded 
 1632 - Pyotr Beketov founded Yakutsk and Zhigansk. Two years later, the Yakuts defeated the Cossack detachment of Ivan Galkin on the Lena and laid siege to Yakutsk. Such a counterattack by the local population was largely due to the strife between the Cossack detachments (Mangazeya and Yenisei), who were in conflict over the collection of yasak
 1633 - Ivan Rebrov discovered the mouth of the Lena and the Yana River
 1638 - Yakut Voivodeship was established, the horse campaign of the centurion Ivanov to Indigirka against the Yukaghirs
 1638 - expedition of the stolnik Peter Golovin and clerk Efim Filatov to the Lena River to build a prison
 1639 - Kopylov sent a detachment under the command of Ivan Moskvitin to the Sea of Lamsky
 1643 - Ataman Vasily Kolesnikov reaches Lake Baikal while Mikhail Stadukhin reaches Kolyma
 1643 - Vasily Poyarkov's expedition to the Amur region (Dauria), rafting down the Amur to the Sea of Okhotsk
 1644-1645 - campaign of the Cossacks against the Buryats in the Angarsk Steppe
 1646 - expedition of Vasily Poyarkov: a campaign from Yakutsk to the Sea of Okhotsk
 1647 - Ivan Moskvitin founded Okhotsk
 1648 - Semyon Dezhnev passes the Bering Strait, the first European to do so, 80 years before Vitus Bering.
 1648-1653 - Yerofey Khabarov's campaigns in Dauria
 1649-1689 - Russian-Qing border conflict 
 1652 - Battle of Achan prison
 1653 - Chita and Nerchinsk were founded in Transbaikalia
 1655 - Siege of Kumar prison
 1661 - Irkutsk was founded on the Angara by Yakov Pokhabov
 1665 - Selenginsky prison was founded by Gavrila Lovtsov on the Selenga
 1666 - on the Uda, at its confluence with the Selenga, the Uda winter hut was founded, later to be known as the Uda jail
 1685-1686 - Siege of Albazin
 1686 - an unsuccessful attempt to penetrate Taimyr (Ivan Tolstoukhov): the expedition went missing
 1689 - China and Russia sign the Treaty of Nerchinsk
 1692 - an expedition of Russian service people against the Yenisei Kirghiz, the defeat of the Tubinsky ulus. Up to 700 Kirghiz were killed in the battle.
 1697-1698 - the annexation of Kamchatka by the expedition of Vladimir Atlasov
 1699 - when returning to the Anadyr prison, the Seryukov detachment was destroyed

18th century: Conquest of Chukotka and Kamchatka 

 1703-1715 - an uprising in Kamchatka against the Russians, during which the Bolsheretsky and Aklansky prisons were burned and about 200 Cossacks were killed; in 1705, the Koryaks destroyed a Cossack detachment led by Protopopov. In 1715, the Russians took the largest Koryak settlement, Bolshoy Posad.
 1709 - Bikatun prison was set up in the foothills of Altai
 1711 - Danila Antsiferov discovers the Kuril Islands
 1712 - revolt and murder of their chiefs (Atlasov, Chirikov, and Mironov) by the Cossacks in Kamchatka
 1712 - Mercury Vagin discovers the New Siberian Islands
 1716 - Omsk is founded 
 1730s-1740s - Trips to Chukotka. Military expeditions of Russian detachments under the command of Pavlutsky.
 1733-1743 - The Great Northern Expedition to explore the Siberian coast of the Arctic Ocean (Khariton Laptev, Semyon Cheyuskin): the deserted Taimyr was explored, the mountains of Byrranga and Cape Chelyuskin (The Northern tip of Siberia) were discovered 
 1740 - Petropavlovsk-Kamchatsky was founded
 1747 - The Chukchi destroyed the detachment of the Anadyr commandant
 1748-1755 - Seven military campaigns against the Chukchi
 1752 - The Gizhiginskaya fortress was founded 
 1753 - Siege by the Koryaks of the Gizhiginskaya fortress
 1778 - The final annexation of Chukotka

Ideology
The core ideological justification for Russian expansion into Siberia stemmed from the interpretation that the legal incorporation of the Khanate of Sibir into the Russian realm gave Russia legal sovereignty over the entirety of the territory stretching from the Ural Mountains to the Pacific Ocean to the east. The actual boundaries of Siberia thus became very vaguely defined and open to interpretation; effectively, Russian dominion over the land ended only whenever Russia's claims to land conflicted with those of centralised states capable of opposing Russian expansion and consistently asserting their own sovereignty over a given territory, such as China and Mongolia. A second ideological pillar justifying Russian colonialism was the spread of Eastern Orthodox Christianity, although this pretext originated largely from explorers and settlers themselves as an ad hoc justification rather than being put forward by the Russian Orthodox Church itself.

See also
List of Russian explorers
Russian irredentism
Sino-Russian border conflicts
Siberian regionalism

References

Further reading
 Bassin, Mark. "Inventing Siberia: visions of the Russian East in the early nineteenth century." American Historical Review 96.3 (1991): 763–794. online

 Gibson, J. R. "The Significance of Siberia to Tsarist Russia," Canadian Slavonic Papers, 14 (1972): 442–53.

 Lantzeff, George Vjatcheslau, and Raymond Henry Fisher. Siberia in the seventeenth century: a study of the colonial administration (U of California Press, 1943).
 Lantzeff, G. V. and R. A. Pierce, Eastward to Empire: Exploration and Conquest on the Russian Open Frontier, to 1750 (Montreal, 1973)

Geography, topical maps
 Barnes, Ian. Restless Empire: A Historical Atlas of Russia (2015), copies of historic maps
 Catchpole, Brian. A Map History of Russia (Heinemann Educational Publishers, 1974), new topical maps.
 Channon, John, and Robert Hudson. The Penguin historical atlas of Russia (Viking, 1995), new topical maps.
 Chew, Allen F. An atlas of Russian history: eleven centuries of changing borders (Yale UP, 1970), new topical maps.
 Gilbert, Martin. Atlas of Russian history (Oxford UP, 1993), new topical maps.
 Parker, William Henry. An historical geography of Russia (Aldine, 1968).

16th-century military history of Russia
17th-century military history of Russia
History of European colonialism
Russification
History of Siberia
Khanate of Sibir
Wars involving Russia
Territorial evolution of Russia
Genocides in Asia